ANSI art is a computer art form that was widely used at one time on bulletin board systems. It is similar to ASCII art, but constructed from a larger set of 256 letters, numbers, and symbols — all codes found in IBM code page 437, often referred to as extended ASCII and used in MS-DOS and Unix environments. ANSI art also contains special ANSI escape sequences that color text with the 16 foreground and 8 background colours offered by ANSI.SYS, an MS-DOS device driver loosely based upon the ANSI X3.64 standard for text terminals. Some ANSI artists take advantage of the cursor control sequences within ANSI X3.64 in order to create animations, commonly referred to as ANSImations.  ANSI art and text files which incorporate ANSI codes carry the de facto  file extension.

Overview
ANSI art is considerably more flexible than ASCII art, because the particular character set it uses contains symbols intended for drawing, such as a wide variety of box-drawing characters and block characters that dither the foreground and background color. It also adds accented characters and math symbols that often find creative use among ANSI artists.

The popularity of ANSI art encouraged the creation of a powerful shareware package called TheDraw coded by Ian E. Davis in 1986. Not only did it considerably simplify the process of making an ANSI art screen from scratch, but it also included a variety of "fonts", large letters constructed from box and block characters, and transition animations such as dissolve and clock. No new versions of TheDraw emerged after version 4.63 in 1993, but in later years a number of other ANSI editors appeared, some of which are still maintained today.

The popular game creation system (GCS) ZZT used ANSI graphics exclusively. A later GCS based on the same concept, MegaZeux, allowed users to modify the extended ASCII character set as well.

Trade Wars 2002, a multiplayer BBS game that remains popular decades after its release in 1986, used ANSI graphics to depict ships, planets, and important locations, and included cutscenes and even a cinema with ANSI animations.  Many of these ANSI graphics were created by Drew Markham, who went on to form Xatrix Entertainment/Gray Matter Studios and develop Redneck Rampage and Return to Castle Wolfenstein, among other titles.

The rise of the internet caused the decline of both BBSes and DOS users, which made ANSI graphics harder to create and to view due to the lack of software compatible with the new dominant operational system Microsoft Windows.

In the end of 2002, all traditional ANSI art groups like ACiD, ICE, CIA, Fire, Dark and many others, were no longer making periodic releases of artworks, called "artpacks" and the community of artists almost vanished. Since then this form of art is no longer practiced to the degree it once was, but was still kept alive by fewer newly created groups like SENSE, 27inch and the late Blocktronics Textmode Art Collective, founded in 2008, and that currently releases artpacks created by artists from all around the world.

Nowadays ANSI graphics have a niche utility for a few telnet BBSes still active and is mainly created by artists for the sake of it and exhibited as an example of retro digital art. The creation of newer Microsoft Windows compatible software like ACiDDraw, TundraDraw and the currently most used PabloDraw, which runs on both Windows and Mac, allowed the small number of remaining artists to keep creating ANSI art. ANSI Art is also practised among demoscene hobbyists still in the 2020s and ANSI art compos (competitions) are regularly held at various demoparties.

Scene 
The ANSI artform found wide popularity and distribution on BBS systems throughout North America and the world. Its use of standard computer symbols and colors by particularly talented individuals made it somewhat of a 'cult' art form and provided a springboard for talented computer artists in later years.

This form gave rise to a 'scene', or subculture community of artists who created competitive groups, similar to hackers (and sometimes overlapping these groups).  These groups would assemble their best, most current art into downloadable 'packs' for distribution on BBS systems.  These could be simply zipped packs of loose art with some text files explaining them, or encoded programs that displayed the art, sometimes with music in MOD format accompanying.

See also

 ANSI escape code
 
 TheDraw

References

Bibliography
 Scott, Jason.  "BBS: The Documentary" (DVD).  Boston, MA: Bovine Ignition Systems, 2005.
 Danet, Brenda.  "Cyberpl@y: Communicating Online".  Oxford, UK: Berg, 2001.  .
 "Dark Domain: the artpacks.acid.org collection" (DVD-ROM).  San Jose, CA, USA: ACiD Productions, LLC, 2004.  .
 Zetter, Kim.  How Humble BBS Begat Wired World.  Wired News.  June 8, 2005.

External links

A detailed table of the character set in IBM code page 437

ASCII art
Bulletin board systems